Caullery is a surname. Notable people with the surname include:

 Louis de Caullery ( 1580–1621), pioneer of the genre of courtly gatherings in Flemish painting of the 17th century
 Maurice Caullery (1868–1958), French biologist

ceb:Caullery
it:Caullery
nl:Caullery
pl:Caullery
sr:Caullery